Rocanville is a community in Saskatchewan, Canada, and home to the largest oil can in the world. It is home of the Potash Corporation of Saskatchewan (PCS) potash mine which recently announced a $1.6 billion expansion. Rocanville is also the home of the Symons Oiler factory which produced over 1 million oil cans during the Second World War.  The town erected the giant oil can to commemorate the factory.

Rocanville is also known for crop circles that were discovered there in the fall of 1996.

Fort Espérance, an archaeological site in Rocanville believed to contain the remains of two late 18th- and early 19th-century fur trade forts, was designated a National Historic Site of Canada in 1944. The Rocanville and District Museum Site, the Rocanville Farmers Building and the Symons Metalworks have all been designated as Municipal Heritage Properties under the provincial Heritage Property Act.

Demographics 

Climate

See also
List of communities in Saskatchewan
List of towns in Saskatchewan

References

External links

Towns in Saskatchewan
Rocanville No. 151, Saskatchewan
Division No. 5, Saskatchewan